Evergreen Line can refer to one of the following:

 The Evergreen Extension to the Millennium Line rapid transit route in Vancouver, British Columbia
 The fleet of container ships operated by Evergreen Marine